John Aitkin may refer to:

John the Painter (1752–1777), Scot who committed acts of terror in British naval dockyards in 1776–77
John Aitkin (surgeon) (fl. 1770–1790), Scottish surgeon

See also
John Aitken (disambiguation)